Black Eye Books (formerly called Black Eye Productions) is a small but influential Canadian comic book publishing company founded by Michel Vrana. Under the auspices of Vrana, Black Eye was known as a publisher of artfully designed alternative comics and graphic novels, most of whose cartoonists have gone on to successful careers with fellow Canadian publisher Drawn & Quarterly. For several years, Vrana acted as Drawn & Quarterly's exclusive outside design consultant. In 2019 the company was relaunched as a micro-press with a focus on using crowdfunding to bring projects to fruition.

History 
Vrana's first worked with publisher Tragedy Strikes Press, which operated out of Guelph, Ontario, from 1991–1993. Comics published by Tragedy Strikes Press included Nick Craine's The Cheeseheads, the anthology series Reactor Girl, Jay Stephens' Sin, Carol Swain's Way Out Strips, and the first issue of Dylan Horrocks' Pickle. Sin and Pickle were picked up by Black Eye Books; Way Out Strips was picked up by Fantagraphics.

Black Eye acted as a comic book publisher from 1992 to 1998, when Vrana transitioned the business to graphic design studio. In 2019, Vrana relaunched Black Eye Books to publish the previously cancelled 11th issue of Pickle, by Dylan Horrocks. This was followed by the publication of Dejects, by Jay Stephens, the first full-colour publication from Black Eye. It currently publishes "Dwellings (vol. 3)" and the popular "Dishman".

Publications

Ongoing titles and limited series 
 Atomic City Tales vol. 1 (Jay Stephens, 1994–1995)
 Berlin (Jason Lutes, 1996–1998)
 Dear Julia (Brian Biggs, 4 issues, 1996-1997)
 The Land of Nod vol. 1 (Jay Stephens, 1996–1997)
 Pickle (Dylan Horrocks, 1992-1997, 2019)
 The Sands (Tom Hart, 1996–1997)
 Sin Comics (Jay Stephens, 1993–1994)
 Sputnik (anthology, 1993–1994)

Graphic novels/trade paperbacks 
 Atomic City Tales (Jay Stephens, 1994)
 Black Candy (Matt Madden, 1998) 
 A Complete Lowlife (Ed Brubaker, 1997)
 Dance Me Outside: The Illustrated Screenplay (Nick Craine, 1994) 
 Dejects (Jay Stephens, 2019) 
 Hicksville (Dylan Horrocks, 1998)
 Human Remains (Darren Raye & Sean Scoffield, 1994)
 Jar of Fools (Jason Lutes, 1995)
 The Land of Nod Treasury (Jay Stephens, 1994)
 The Sands: a Picture Story (Tom Hart, 1998)

Cartoonists associated with Black Eye
 Brian Biggs
 Ed Brubaker
 Nick Craine
 Tom Hart
 Dylan Horrocks
 Jason Lutes
 Matt Madden
 Darren Raye
 Sean Scoffield
 Jay Stephens

Notes

External links
 
 Black Eye at the Grand Comics Database

Comic book publishing companies of Canada
Mass media companies established in 1992